Mae, Mäe or Maé is a surname that may refer to

Audra Mae (born 1984), American singer-songwriter and violin player
Christophe Maé (born 1975), French singer
Epp Mäe (born 1992), Estonian wrestler
Hjalmar Mäe (1901–1978), Estonian politician
Jaak Mae (born 1972), Estonian cross-country skier
Vanessa-Mae (born 1978) a British violinist of Thai-Chinese descent